The buff-breasted sandpiper (Calidris subruficollis) is a small shorebird. The species name subruficollis is from Latin subrufus, "reddish" (from sub, "somewhat", and rufus, "rufous") and collis, "-necked/-throated" (from collum, "neck"). It is a calidrid sandpiper.

Description
This species is brown above, and has a buff face and underparts in all plumages. It has a short bill and yellow legs. Males are larger than females. Juveniles resemble the adults, but may be paler on the rear underparts.

Distribution and habitat

C. subruficollis breeds in the open arctic tundra of North America and is a very long-distance migrant, spending the non-breeding season mainly in South America, especially Argentina.

It migrates mainly through central North America, and is uncommon on the coasts. It occurs as a regular wanderer to western Europe, and is not classed as rare in Great Britain or Ireland, where small flocks have occurred. Only the pectoral sandpiper is a more common American shorebird visitor to Europe.

This species nests as far north as Canada including Alaska on the ground, laying four eggs. The male has a display which includes raising the wings to display the white undersides, which is also given on migration, sometimes when no other buff-breasted sandpipers are present. Outside the breeding season, this bird is normally found on short-grass habitats such as airfields or golf-courses, rather than near water.

These birds pick up food by sight, mainly eating insects and other invertebrates. The buff-breasted sandpipers are known to prey on Bombus polaris, a species of bumblebee found within the Arctic Circle. They will either eat the bees or feed them to their young. They are often very tame.

Buff-breasted sandpipers are suspected to have hybridized with the white-rumped or Baird's sandpiper.

In South Asia and Australia
This species has been sighted in South Asia on at least three occasions. It is believed that instead of going to Argentina, this bird might have been wind-blown from the Great Plains Flyway of North America and landed up in South Asia. In November 2011, this species was sighted by Dr.Jayan Thomas and P.C. Rajeevan near Kannur, Kerala in South India. and photographed by Dr. Jayan Thomas. The buff-breasted sandpiper has also been recorded in Australia on at least eight occasions.

In 1978, Phillips recorded the species from Sri Lanka, and after that very few sightings were recorded. In 2001 a single bird was also recorded in Marievale, South Africa.

References

External links 

 
 
 
 Buff-breasted sandpiper Species Account – Cornell Lab of Ornithology
 Buff-breasted sandpiper - Tryngites subruficollis - USGS Patuxent Bird Identification InfoCenter
 
 
 

buff-breasted sandpiper
buff-breasted sandpiper
Birds of the Arctic
Native birds of Alaska
Birds of Canada
Birds of South America
buff-breasted sandpiper
buff-breasted sandpiper